Alford (pronounced   or) is a large village in Aberdeenshire, north-east Scotland, lying just south of the River Don. It lies within the Howe of Alford (also called the Vale of Alford) which occupies the middle reaches of the River Don.

The place-name is thought to come from the Scots ; its original position being on the banks of the Don. The "L" sound in the word has, over time, been dropped, and is silent. Alford gave its name to a battle of the Battle of Alford (1645). It is also the home of the Aberdeen Angus cattle breed, which is celebrated by a life-sized model of a bull on the edge of the village, which the Queen Mother inaugurated in 2001. It is believed that the original breeding ground of the cattle was Buffal, located between Tough (Tulloch) and Craigievar  nearby Alford. Another claim to fame for the town is Alford Oatmeal, ground at Montgarrie, just outside the town. Alford also sports the Alford Community Campus, with a library and pool.

The Alford Valley Railway, Grampian Transport Museum, Alford Heritage Museum and Craigievar Castle are popular visitor attractions, with a range of other archaeological sites, stone circles, and castles (including Balfluig Castle, Castle Fraser and Drum Castle) being within easy reach by road. One stone circle, originally believed to be prehistoric, turned out to be a 20-year-old replica. Situated in Alford, Haughton Country Park is a large and popular green space with a caravan park and woodland walks.

Sport 
Alford Golf Club opened on 15 May 1981. Initially a nine hole course, it reopened as an eighteen hole course in May 1992.

Public transport
Alford railway station was the former terminus of the closed Alford Valley Railway branch line.

There is much new housebuilding going on in Alford  to cater for a workforce who mainly commute in Aberdeen to work in the oil industry. Bus services are operated by Stagecoach, with dial-a-bus services being operated by Aberdeenshire Council. Bus services connecting Alford to Aberdeen go by two different routes:
the 218 goes via Westhill
the X20 goes via Kintore and Kemnay.

Notable residents
 Alford is the birthplace of the renowned poet, Charles Murray
 Stewart Milne, chairman of both the Stewart Milne Group and Aberdeen Football Club was born nearby and attended school in Alford
John Forbes, minister exiled by James VI
Lord Forbes, of Forbes Castle
William McCombie, pioneer Aberdeen Angus breeder
Laura Main, actress in Call the Midwife
Emeli Sandé, award winning singer/songwriter.
Dougie Gray, Rangers F.C. fullback
William Minto, critic and novelist

References

External links

Villages in Aberdeenshire